Frost Glacier is a channel glacier flowing to the head of Porpoise Bay, Antarctica. It was delineated from air photos taken by U.S. Navy Operation Highjump (1946–47), and named by the Advisory Committee on Antarctic Names for John Frost, boatswain on the brig Porpoise of the United States Exploring Expedition (1838–42) under Charles Wilkes.

See also
 List of glaciers in the Antarctic
 Glaciology

References

Glaciers of Wilkes Land